Local elections were held in  Marilao, Bulacan on May 9, 2022 within the Philippine general election. The voters elected the elective local posts in the municipality: the mayor, vice mayor, and eight councilors.

Background

Incumbent Mayor Ricky Silvestre is running for reelection. His main opponent is Atty. Jem Sy, an actress and president of the Jemina Sy Foundation, who previously ran for mayor in the 2019 elections.

Results
The candidates for mayor and vice mayor with the highest number of votes wins the seat; they are voted separately, therefore, they may be of different parties when elected.

Mayor

Electoral protest
On May 24, 2022, the Regional Trial Court approved Atty. Jem Sy's electoral protest against incumbent mayor Ricky Silvestre. This will be the second protest the former has filed against the latter, the first being dismissed in 2019.

Vice Mayor

Sangguniang Bayan election
Election is via plurality-at-large voting: A voter votes for up to eight candidates, then the eight candidates with the highest number of votes are elected.

Incumbent Councilors Deby Espiritu-Reyes and Arnold Papa are term-limited; Deby's daughter, Gizelle, and Arnold's brother, Arnel, will run for their seats. Councilor Irma Celones is also term-limited, and ran for vice mayor. Councilor Mark Guillermo is also term-limited but opted not to run for other positions. Councilor Ariel Amador will be running for his third and final term, while Allane Sayo, Marlon Villamar and William Villarica will run for their second terms. 

Returning politicians are former councilor Bob dela Cruz and former mayor Tito Santiago.

|-bgcolor=black
|colspan=25|

References

External links
 https://comelec.gov.ph/php-tpls-attachments/2022NLE/BallotTemplates/REGION_III/BULACAN/MARILAO.pdf

2022 Philippine general election
May 2022 events in the Philippines
Elections in Marilao
2022 elections in Central Luzon